Hadji Nikoli (1826-1892), was a famous merchant, Bulgarian patriot, participant in the Bulgarian Independent Orthodox Church Fight.

Biography
Hadji Nikoli was born in 1826 in Tarnovo, Bulgaria.  His father Hadji Dimo was a fur and leather merchant. Young Nikoli received  education of high quality. One of  his teachers  Evtim – a priest – was a Bulgarian patriot who hated the Greek men of God who ruled the Church of Bulgaria.

Bulgarian Independent Orthodox Church independence
Hadji Nikoli became a patriot too who dedicated his life to the Bulgarian Orthodox Church independence.  He left Tarnovo and settled down in Constantinople (today Istanbul).  He kept active correspondence with representatives from all towns in Bulgaria and protected the rights of the Bulgarian Orthodox population.  He expressed the requests to the Turkish Sultan.  The fight was long and difficult, over 40 years. Many representatives resisted because of lack of finance.  Hadji Nikoli and d-r Stojan Chomakov from Plovdiv was the only persons who fight till the end.

Hadji Nikoli Inn
Hadji Nikoli Inn  was built during the period of 1858–1862 by the native constructor  Nikola Fichev (usta Koljo Ficheto) for the rich merchant Hadji Nikola Minchev (Hadji Nikoli). Today the Inn is the only one survived in Veliko Tarnovo among 70 built in the town.

Sources 
 Енциклопедия България,  том 4 / 1984 г., с. 273
 Бележити търновци,  С.1985 г., с. 125/126
 Евтимова Вера, Ханът на Хаджи Николи, 2007
 Пътеводител на гр. Велико  Търново и околността му, В.Т. 1907 г., с. 79
 Русев Сава, "Търново през погледа на дедите ни"
 Радев Иван, "История на Велико Търново XVIII - XIX век", "Слово", В.Т.,2000, стр.482-486
 "Биографията на х. Николи Д. Минчев от гр. В. Търново", С. 1907 г.
 Колева Елена, Колева Ивелина, "Връзките на хаджи Николи Минчооглу от Търново с чорбаджи Иванчо Пенчов Калпазанов от Габрово в борбата за черковна независимост, и поп Иван Гъбенски чорбаджи",   в-к "Християни" (към "100 вести"), 07.07.2011г., стр. 1-2 - част І и бр. от 14.07.2011 г., стр. 2 -ІІ част

External links 
 https://web.archive.org/web/20110827101951/http://hanhadjinikoli.com/english.php

1826 births
1892 deaths
19th-century Bulgarian businesspeople
People from Veliko Tarnovo